Scotoplanes is a genus of deep-sea sea cucumbers of the family Elpidiidae. Its species are commonly known as sea pigs.

Locomotion
Members of the Elpidiidae have particularly enlarged tube "feet" that have taken on a leg-like appearance, using water cavities within the skin to inflate and deflate thereby causing the appendages to move. These appendages are different from the normal tube feet of the broader order of Elasipodida due the replacement of ampullae with dermal cavities to account for the larger size of the Elpidiidae tube feet. Scotoplanes move through the top layer of seafloor sediment and disrupt both the surface and the resident infauna as it feeds. This type of movement is thought to be an adaptation to life on the soft floor of the deep-sea. These creatures, however, are able to swim when disturbed. Some species of Scotoplanes are benthopelagic and spend plenty of time in the water column. A frontal lobe as well as two anal lobes propel the sea pig through the water. Their tentacles help detect their surroundings while moving.

Ecology 
Scotoplanes live on deep ocean bottoms, specifically on the abyssal plain in the Atlantic, Pacific and Indian Oceans, typically at depths of over  Some related species can be found in the Antarctic. Scotoplanes (and all deep-sea holothurians) are deposit feeders and obtain food by extracting organic particles from deep-sea mud. Scotoplanes globosa has been observed to demonstrate strong preferences for rich, organic food that has freshly fallen from the ocean's surface and uses olfaction to locate preferred food sources such as whale corpses. Scotoplanes, like many sea cucumbers, often occur in huge densities, sometimes numbering in the hundreds when observed. Early collections have recorded groups of up to 300-600 individuals. Sea pigs are also known to host different parasitic invertebrates, including gastropods (snails) and small tanaid crustaceans. 

Scotoplanes, like other sea cucumbers, host parasitic and commensal organisms. For example, it provides a shelter to juvenile crabs, Neolithodes diomedeae. It is known that such relationship benefits the crabs because they can reduce risks of predation when they are under the shelter.

Scotoplanes are known to exhibit behavioral patterns of aggregation, where large numbers will aggregate either to feed or mate.

Size 
They are bilaterally symmetrical with six pairs of tube feet, which are largest at mid-body and smallest near the anus. Scotoplanes also have ten buccal tentacles lining the oral cavity.

Physiology 
Scotoplanes are tiny and have their own defence mechanism to protect themselves from predators. Their skin contains a toxic chemical called holothurin which is poisonous to other creatures. They have external appendages which include tube feet, dorsal papillae, and buccal tentacles.

Like all echinoderms, Scotoplanes have a poorly developed respiratory system and they breathe from their anus. This refers to the lack of a respiratory tree. Their bodies are made for the deep seas and bringing them too close to the surface would cause them to disintegrate. Also similar to other echinoderms is Scotoplanes nervous system, which consists of a network of nerves without ganglia.

Scotoplanes have unique reproductive systems that consist of one gonad in both female and male organisms. This means one ovary in females and one testis in males. This is different from most echinoderms. Also unique from most elasipodids is that active gametogenesis was observed in both females and males, pointing to a different reproduction strategy in Scotoplanes.

Similar to other echinoderms, Scotoplanes have a water vascular system. The dorsal papillae are similar histologically to Scotoplanes''' tube feet, as both contain a large muscular water vascular canal in the center. Hydraulic pressure in these canals are responsible for the efficacy of the vascular system. 

Taxonomy
The genus includes the following species:

 Scotoplanes angelicus Scotoplanes globosa Scotoplanes mutabilis''
A study done provides histologic findings that these deep-sea dwelling sea pigs are similar to other holothuroidea, though there are few notable differences: Most holothurians are sexually dioecious with sexes in separate individuals. Unlike other echinoderms, holothuroids possess only a single gonad. The water vascular system of holothuians is similar to other echinoderms, except the madreporite opens in the perivisceral coelom instead of in the external body wall. In male Scotoplanes their aboral intestines have protozoa inside these cyst cavities.

References

External links
 Scotoplanes article and photos on Echinoblog
 Sea pigs? Gross or cool? on Animal Planet website
  Neptune Canada "Sea Pig Slow Dance"
 Scotoplanes as a refuge for crabs

Further reading
Ruhl, Henry A., and Kenneth L. Smith, Jr. "Go to Science." Science Magazine: Sign In. Science., 23 July 2004. Web. 1 May 2015.

Holothuroidea genera
Elpidiidae
Taxa named by Johan Hjalmar Théel